Tim Blanchard (born 30 June 1987) is an Australian racing driver.

Blanchard has raced in several other motor racing series, including the British Formula Ford Championship, and was the winner of the 2007 Australian Formula Ford Championship.

Early career

Karting
Blanchard raced in various classes throughout his karting career, resulting in numerous titles. His final two years were particularly notable, taking out all before him in a dominant two years for the young Victorian. 
2003 saw Tim take out the Victorian Junior National Heavy Title before winning the Australian Junior National Heavy Title in the National Sprint Kart Championships at Ipswich Kart Raceway, Ipswich, QLD. This was another successful year for Tim as he looked to move into the senior class after taking both junior titles on offer.  
In the 2004 season, Tim took out the Victorian Senior National Heavy Title before winning the Australian Title at Hume International Raceway in Puckapunyal. This would prove to be his final year in karts as a foray into Formula Ford awaited.

Formula Ford

Australia
Blanchard progressed into Formula Ford in 2005, participating in both the Australian and Victoria State Championships in his first season. Tim finished third in the Victorian Series, however only entering three races in the Australian Championship as he gathered much-needed experience in the open wheeler class.

He turned his concentration fully onto the Australian Championship in 2006, and under the guidance of Sonic Motor Racing Services, finished the season with 186 points and five podiums, resulting in a fifth place in the championship. 
2007 saw Blanchard have his biggest success to date when he took out the Australian Formula Ford Championship with seven wins and sixteen podiums from the twenty-four race series.

UK
After winning the 2007 Australian Formula Ford Championship, Tim set his sights on conquering the British Formula Ford Championship, a series with a rich history, and a proving ground for many of the biggest names in motorsport. Blanchard signed with Jamun Racing Services, one of the most successful teams in British Formula Ford, and together with his teammate Wayne Boyd, set about dominating the championship. With 3 race wins, 16 podiums & 5 poles, Blanchard finished the 2008 British Formula Ford Championship in 2nd place, 50 points behind his teammate Wayne Boyd. This was another breakout year for Blanchard, culminating in a 3rd-place finish at the season-ending Formula Ford Festival. His mechanic for the season was Scott Malvern who went on to be a successful racing driver in his own right winning the British Formula Ford Championship and Formula Ford Festival with Jamun in 2011.

Due to some funding shortfalls following the Global Financial Crisis, Blanchard was unable to secure a drive for the 2009 season. Tim instead concentrated his efforts on completing his accounting degree at Swinburne University whilst also assisting a number of teams in both V8s and Formula Ford throughout the season.

Supercars

Development Series

In 2010 Blanchard reunited with Sonic Motor Racing Services for the 2010 Fujitsu V8 Supercar Series. Blanchard drove the ex-Triple Eight Falcon BF that James Moffat drove in the 2009 Fujitsu V8 Series. Following a season in the wilderness, Blanchard took no time to settle, finishing 5th in both races at the 2010 Clipsal 500. His standout performance came in Round 4 at the 2010 Sucrogen Townsville 400, winning the round with two podiums including his first race win. Consistency was the key throughout the season, as Blanchard finished 2nd in the 2010 Fujitsu V8 Supercar Series.

2011 saw Blanchard sign with MW Motorsport to team up with the experienced David Russell in the Team Jayco BF Falcons. Blanchard drove the ex-FPR Falcon BF that Tony Bates drove in the 2010 Fujitsu V8 Supercar Series. After a successful year with Sonic Motor Racing Services, Blanchard started off the season at MW Motorsport with his best result for the year, finishing 2nd in the opening round of the 2011 Fujitsu V8 Supercar Series at the 2011 Clipsal 500. Another standout result was his 2nd Fujitsu V8 Supercar Series career race win at the 2011 Sucrogen Townsville 400. Blanchard finished every round of the season in the top 10, culminating in a 5th-place finish in the 2011 Fujitsu V8 Supercar Series.

2012 saw Blanchard remain in the Dunlop V8 Supercar Series with MW Motorsport. He piloted the ex-FPR Falcon FG that Mark Winterbottom drove in the 2011 V8 Supercars Championship. Following an incident-packed first round at the 2012 Clipsal 500, Blanchard recorded his best finish of the year, a 5th at the 2012 Trading Post Perth Challenge. Consistent strong results followed, but Blanchard's development series program came to a premature end as main series commitments with Kelly Racing, substituting for the injured Todd Kelly, meant he could not complete the season with MW Motorsport.

Supercars Championship
Blanchard's first experience in the main series came when he picked up an endurance co-driving role with Paul Morris Motorsport, partnering Greg Murphy in the 2010 L&H 500, where they finished 13th.

In 2011 Blanchard signed with Kelly Racing for the two endurance events in the 2011 V8 Supercars Championship, the 2011 L&H 500 and the 2011 Supercheap Auto Bathurst 1000. Blanchard raced alongside David Reynolds in the teams No. 16 Stratco Commodore, making his Bathurst 1000 debut where mechanical issues saw them finish 19th following a standout 6th place at the 2011 L&H 500.

2012 saw Blanchard retained by Kelly Racing for the two endurance events in the 2012 V8 Supercars Championship, the 2012 Dick Smith Sandown 500 and the 2012 Supercheap Auto Bathurst 1000. Blanchard partnered Todd Kelly in the teams No. 7 Jack Daniels Commodore, finishing credible 18th at both events. Following the 2012 Supercheap Auto Bathurst 1000, Blanchard was called up by Kelly Racing to substitute for an injured Todd Kelly for the remaining four rounds of the 2012 V8 Supercars Championship.

In 2013 Blanchard was given a full-time drive with Dick Johnson Racing, Driving the No. 17 Entry.

In 2014 Blanchard became an endurance cup driver, joining Lucas Dumbrell Motorsport.

In 2015 Blanchard continued with LDM but was promoted to a full-time drive in the team's No. 3 Commodore.

In 2016 Blanchard moved to Britek Motorsport, a satellite team of Brad Jones Racing.

In 2017 the Britek REC was replaced by Blanchard's own, Blanchard Racing Team, purchased from Super Black Racing.

Mike Kable Young Gun Award

Following the 2010 Fujitsu V8 Supercar Series, Blanchard collected the coveted Mike Kable Young Gun Award.

Motor racing record

Super2 Series results
(key) (Round results only), (2021 Race results only)

Supercars Championship results

Complete Bathurst 1000 results

References

External links
Tim Blanchard Official Website
Tim Blanchard V8 Supercars Official Profile
Tim Blanchard Driver DataBase profile
Tim Blanchard Racing Reference profile

1987 births
Formula Ford drivers
Living people
Racing drivers from Melbourne
Supercars Championship drivers
Australian Endurance Championship drivers
Kelly Racing drivers
Dick Johnson Racing drivers